The Frederick H. Cossitt Memorial Hall, located at 906 N. Cascade Ave. in Colorado Springs, Colorado, was built in 1914.  It has also been known as Cossitt Hall.  It was designed by Maurice B. Biscoe.  It is part of Colorado College.  It was listed on the National Register of Historic Places in 1997.

See also
Frederick H. Cossitt Library, Granby, Connecticut, also NRHP-listed

References

University and college buildings on the National Register of Historic Places in Colorado
University and college buildings completed in 1914
Buildings and structures in Colorado Springs, Colorado
Colorado College
National Register of Historic Places in Colorado Springs, Colorado
1914 establishments in Colorado